Nicola Sturgeon formed the second Sturgeon government following her Scottish National Party's victory in the 2016 Scottish Parliament election. Sturgeon was nominated by a vote of the 5th Scottish Parliament for appointment to the post of first minister on 17 May 2016. She was subsequently appointed by Queen Elizabeth II on 18 May, and announced formation of a new Scottish National Party minority government.

The second Sturgeon government was an SNP minority administration and despite the whipping and resignation of some MSPs, this was also returned by Labour and Conservative opposition MSPs. Like the previous, it consisted of 50/50 gender balance cabinet; 5 men and 5 women. As part of wide criticism of policies, the resignation of many members and in response to the Brexit negotiations, Sturgeon conducted a major cabinet reshuffle in 2018. Following the resignation of Derek Mackay as Finance Secretary in 2020, Sturgeon performed a minor reshuffle of her cabinet. 

The government dissolved on 20 May 2021, following the 2021 election to the 6th Scottish Parliament, which returned the SNP on seat short of a majority and Sturgeon later forming a third administration with a deal with the Scottish Greens, creating a pro-independence majority.

History

Formation of government 
In the May 2016 Scottish Parliament election, the Scottish National Party (SNP) won 63 of the 129 seats contested. Incumbent First Minister Nicola Sturgeon soon afterwards announced her intention to form a minority government. She was nominated for the post of first minister by a vote of the Scottish Parliament on 17 May, defeating Scottish Liberal Democrat leader, Willie Rennie by 63 votes to 5, with 59 abstentions. Ahead of the formation of the new government, long-serving ministers Alex Neil and Richard Lochhead announced their resignations from the cabinet. Sturgeon recommended the appointment of James Wolffe as Lord Advocate and Alison Di Rollo as Solicitor General on 31 May 2016. Their recommendation was confirmed by the Scottish Parliament on the same day.

2018 cabinet reshuffle 
On the 26 June 2018, Sturgeon announced a cabinet reshuffle. Long standing ministers such as Shona Robison and Angela Constance announced their resignation due to personal circumstances, with Keith Brown resigning to take his role as SNP Depute Leader. Cabinet Secretary for Social Security and Older People was promoted to cabinet-level with more social security powers handed to the Scottish Parliament.

2020 cabinet reshuffle 
On the 6 February 2020, on the day of the Scottish Budget, Nicola Sturgeon accepted Derek MacKay's resignation following an article by the Sun newspaper of inappropriate messages sent to a 16-year-old boy. Kate Forbes, then Minister for Public Finance, delivered the Scottish Budget, with Sturgeon later promoting Forbes to Finance Secretary.

Final months 
Sturgeon accepted the resignation of Joe FitzPatrick, Minister of Public Health, Sport and Wellbeing, following Scotland's record high drug deaths. Sturgeon appointed Mairi Gougeon to succeed FitzPatrick, with Angela Constance re-entering government to serve as Minister for Drug Policy.

In the latter half of Sturgeon's administration, she and her government led the Scottish Government's response to the COVID-19 pandemic.

Cabinets

May 2016 to June 2018

June 2018 to February 2020

February 2020 to May 2021

Junior Ministers

Scottish Law Officers

See also 

 Premiership of Nicola Sturgeon

Notes

References

Scottish governments
2016 establishments in Scotland
Nicola Sturgeon
Ministries of Elizabeth II